Bardsey cum Rigton is a civil parish in the metropolitan borough of the City of Leeds, West Yorkshire, England.  It contains 16 listed buildings that are recorded in the National Heritage List for England.  Of these, one is listed at Grade I, the highest of the three grades, and the others are at Grade II, the lowest grade.  The parish contains the villages of Bardsey, and East Rigton, and is otherwise rural.  The most important listed building is All Hallows Church which contains Anglo-Saxon material, and is listed at Grade I.  The other listed buildings consist of houses and cottages, farmhouses and farm buildings, a sundial in the churchyard, a public house, and a milestone.


Key

Buildings

References

Citations

Sources

 

Lists of listed buildings in West Yorkshire